Woodside Township is the name of some places in the U.S. state of Minnesota:
Woodside Township, Otter Tail County, Minnesota
Woodside Township, Polk County, Minnesota

Minnesota township disambiguation pages